Pölöske is a village in Zala County, Hungary. It is famous for the "Pölöskei Szörp" syrup.

References

Populated places in Zala County